Blackburn College is a private college in Carlinville, Illinois. It was established in 1837 and named for the Gideon Blackburn.  The college is affiliated with the Presbyterian Church (USA).

Blackburn is a federally recognized work college with a student-managed work program, enabling students to gain leadership experience as they manage other students.  All resident students are required to work, but the program is optional for commuters.  Each student who works receives a tuition discount for the hours they work.

History
Blackburn College established in 1837 and named for the Rev. Gideon Blackburn, a Presbyterian minister who helped raise funds for the school. By 1855, instruction began at the college. Within two years (1857), the school was chartered as Blackburn Theological Seminary, and the first unit of University Hall was erected. By 1862, several buildings had been developed for study on campus including space for the "Blackburn Academy" an organization for a campus grade and high school. From 1837 until 1864, the school only admitted male students. During 1864, the first woman attended Blackburn, and thus radicalized the movement of admitting female students. In 1864, the school had also been recognized and established as a four-year institution.

In 1869, a new charter has been developed changing the name from Blackburn Theological Seminary to Blackburn University. In 1871, the first draft of the Blackburn Newspaper was established. Today, it is known as the 'Burnian and is the oldest college newspaper still published in Illinois.

William M. Hudson began his tenure as college president in 1912. A year later, he initiated the Student "Self Help Plan" which helped participating students pay $100 tuition in exchange to work 3 hours a day of manual labor. During President Hudson's tenure Blackburn showed much progress. Starting in 1916, students could receive a Certificate of Associates of Arts, and in 1917, the last Blackburn class graduated from the four-year institution.

In the coming years, Blackburn would be established as a Junior College (1918) revoking the charter to have a four-year institution; the school was thus renamed Blackburn College. Between 1922-1924, a large project had been developed and the Construction of the central heating plant occurred between 1922-1924, along with the first (and oldest) residential building, Stoddard Hall.  Stoddard Hall (1924-current) continues as the oldest student-constructed building on campus, and continues to house current Blackburn College students.

McKinley House (1926) was constructed due to a gift given by Senator McKinley. It serves as the housing unit for the college president and their familie(s) during their position at Blackburn College (formerly university). The 1930s offered a lot of progress and perseverance for the school. The previous years several buildings were plagued by fire and destruction, however, by 1930 Hudson Hall was constructed and served as the main academic building replacing the previous building, which burnt down in 1927 (Olde Main). The institution also discarded the Pullman cars as temporary housing units and discontinued the original Blackburn Academy. Other prominent additions were added during this time such as the Diary House, Dawes Gymnasium and the school being accredited by the North Central Associations of Colleges and Schools as a Junior College.

By 1947, the school was re-established as Bachelor of Arts degree institution and the completion of the Library Annex were distinct events during the 1940s for Blackburn College. Three years later, the institution was re-accredited as a four-year Bachelors Degree obtaining institution. Jones-Allison Hall was constructed in 1949. The 1950s-1960s saw a lot of growth of academic and residential buildings completed. In 1964, the Lumpkin Library was completed, later known as the Lumpkin Learning Commons. At this point in time, the Associates of Arts degree had been discontinued.

The 1970s saw additions to older buildings and renovations to older spaces for more updates such as a computer center establish in the first level of Hudson Hall or the development of a pool in the Dawes Gymnasium. By the year 2000 Hudson Hall had been completely renovated.

2002: The construction of Demuzio Campus Center (DCC) completed and operation ensues. This building houses all main campus events such as: Kitchen and/or dining hall, snackbar, Student Affairs Office, Work Program Office, Mail room and the Campus Bookstore.

2008: The Marvin and Ingrid Mahan Science Laboratory constructed = which is one of the first LEED rated buildings in central Illinois, houses state of the art laboratories for biology, chemistry, biochemistry, faculty offices, and a large enclosed atrium.

2009: Swimming pool closed permanently.

2014-2016: Several phases of the Lumpkin Learning Commons renovations had been completed to have a new state-of-the-art Learning Center for students. The C.H.C. Anderson Center ("The Den") renovations are completed and re-named to Claire Jaenke Alumni Welcome Center in C.H.C. Anderson.

2017: The completion of the Dawes Fitness Center located on the East side of the Dawes Gymnasium.

In 2019, Blackburn college announced and began the construction of an 8 acre solar farm. The project was finished in August 2019.

Campus

Blackburn College has 13 academic/administrative buildings, 6 residence halls, and several athletic facilities throughout the campus. Many of these buildings were co-constructed by students as part of the college's Work Program. The campus itself lies on 80 acres of land in Carlinville, Illinois, a small, rural community about an hour north of downtown St. Louis.

Bordered by University Street to the west and Nicholas Street to the south, College Avenue serves as the main artery through the campus and enters through the gates of the college. Along this route, many historical campus landmarks can be seen, including Hudson Hall, Stoddard Hall, and Butler Hall, the three oldest buildings on campus.

Academics

The institution is accredited by the North Central Association of Colleges and Schools. Ninety-six percent of the college's students are full-time participating in the minimum of 12 credits a semester. If students are from an area that falls into the project MAP Grant, a minimum of 15 credits will be required to obtain that grant. 4% of the student population is part-time, allowing for majority of the campus to be full-time students at Blackburn College completing their undergraduate degree. Mean of gender on campus, 43% are men while 57% are women.

Blackburn College is one of many institutions that offer teaching license after the completion of the Education program in the desired division of education programming. Blackburn is accredited to license their teachers through the Illinois State Board of Education.

Blackburn College removed standardized tests from the application process in November 2021. Blackburn College also joined the CommonApp network in 2021.

Work Program
The Work Program was first instituted at Blackburn College in 1913 by William M. Hudson as a means to provide access to higher education to individuals with the academic ability but who lacked financial stability. Therefore, a cost reduction program began at Blackburn College. This "Self-Help Plan", as it was first called, required students to participate in 3 hours a day of manual labor in exchange for the payment of their tuition. This financial model remains an important value of the Work Program today. However, a larger emphasis is put on the opportunities it provides for student learning. Today, the work program consists of 12 Work Departments: Academic Services, Administration Services, Athletic Services, Bookstore, Campus Community and Safety, Community Services, Dining and Hospitality, Lumpkin Student Success Center, Campus Services, Campus Maintenance, Snack Bar, and Technology Services. As of 2020, all resident students work 160 hours each semester (10 hours a week) in partnership with faculty and staff to help provide all services essential to college operations. Due to the Covid-19 pandemic, some on-campus work was offered remotely. Currently, in-person work for the work program has resumed.

Athletics

Blackburn's athletic teams compete in Division III of the NCAA's St. Louis Intercollegiate Athletic Conference. Blackburn, whose teams are known athletically as the Beavers, was a member of the Illinois Intercollegiate Athletic Conference from 1914 to 1923. Blackburn has fielded championship teams in men's basketball, women's basketball, football, men's golf, baseball, and quidditch. The men's golf team earned the most recent SLIAC championship in 2010.

In January 2009, the college announced that it would stop fielding a football team after the 2008-2009 school year.

Men's sports
Basketball
Baseball
Cross country
Golf
Soccer

Women's sports
Basketball
Cross country
Golf
Soccer
Softball
Volleyball

Notable alumni
Mary Hunter Austin, nature writer and novelist
Anthony Beale, Chicago alderman and Congressional candidate
Pug Bennett, Major League Baseball player for St. Louis Cardinals
Karl Berning, Illinois State Senator
Paul M. Bingham, molecular biologist
Frank W. Burton, Illinois state legislator and judge
Lois B. DeFleur, sociologist, former President of Binghamton University
Clarence J. Goodnight, zoologist
Mark Kirk, former U.S. Senator from Illinois (attended briefly)
Peter F. Mack Jr., U.S. Congressman
Kossoy Sisters, singing act
Truman H. Landon, General and Commander, U.S. Air Force
Bruce Pavitt, cofounder of Sub Pop Records (attended briefly)
Dennis Phillips, professional poker player
Charles Robertson, entomologist 
Craig F. Stowers, Chief Justice of the Alaska Supreme Court
Jamie Young, assistant coach, Boston Celtics
Sam McCann, Illinois State Senator, 49th District, Later 50th District
William L. Mounts, Illinois House of Representatives and Senators
John Thomson Faris, Editor, Author, and Clergyman
Richard D. Alexander, zoologist
William Hamilton Anderson, superintendent of the New York Anti-Saloon League
David Felmley, educator, President of Illinois State University from 1900-1930

List of presidents

References

External links
Official website
Official athletic website

 
Educational institutions established in 1837
Buildings and structures in Macoupin County, Illinois
Education in Macoupin County, Illinois
1837 establishments in Illinois
Presbyterianism in Illinois
Universities and colleges affiliated with the Presbyterian Church (USA)
Work colleges
Private universities and colleges in Illinois